Jask Rural District is a rural district (dehestan) in the Central District of Jask County, Hormozgan Province, Iran. At the 2006 census, its population was 6,392, in 1,239 families. The rural district has 23 villages.

References 

Rural Districts of Hormozgan Province
Jask County